Aurora (formerly named Eeebuntu)  (not to be confused with EasyPeasy, formerly known as Ubuntu Eee, and with Aurora (Avrora) OS, a Russian brand of Sailfish OS) was an operating system for netbooks. The latest version is based on Ubuntu, though newer versions were planned to be based on Debian Unstable. Eeebuntu was designed originally for the Asus Eee PC line of netbooks.

Four versions are available for install: Standard, NBR (standard with Ubuntu Netbook Edition), Base and LXDE.

Features 
 Works out of the box on Asus Eee PC 700, 701, 900, 900A, 901, 904HD, 1000, 1000H, 1000HA, 1000HD and 1000HE. Recent versions also work out of the box on the Acer Aspire One A110L.
 Includes an Asus Eee PC specific kernel which is tuned for Eee's hardware (e.g., Wi-Fi module, function keys).
 VLC, Flash and Java installed out of the box.
 Can create a bootable USB stick or SD card using UNetbootin.
 Integrates the eeepc-tray ACPI (now changed to Jupiter) utility to control ACPI events and toggle certain devices on the Eee on/off.

History 
Eeebuntu was created in December 2007 by Steve Wood. At that time Eeebuntu was little more than a collection of scripts applied to a live Ubuntu image.  As the project matured the post install scripts were dropped in favour of a modified kernel that contained pre-compiled hardware drivers.

Other developers took interest in the project and by December 2008 Eeebuntu had grown into a Linux distribution in its own right with around 1,500 registered forum users.  Eeebuntu 2.0 was the first Eeebuntu version to completely remove Ubuntu branding and use its own artwork and themes.

With the expanded interest in Eeebuntu as a distro for numerous netbooks ( beyond its namesake's Asus Eee Pc's ) it expanded support to multiple Netbooks with new kernel changes and drivers compiled. 

In 2008 Other notable mebers of the leadership joined the project such as Paul McDonough; responsible for the kernel patching, packaging, design and promotion of Eeebuntu allowing Steve and other contributers to focus on development of new capabilities. Work was done alongside other notable distributions at the time such as elementary OS to share FOSS code and provide capabilities such as improved Nautilus File Manager and other lightweight applications as the baseline systems shipped with Eeebuntu 3.0. 

Eeebuntu has 4 versions:
 Base - 565MB ISO footprint, reduced number of pre-installed applications.
 Standard - A compiz enabled full desktop with a number of pre-installed applications.
 NBR - Using the Ubuntu Netbook interface with a number of pre-installed applications.
 LXDE - Utilising the LXDE desktop and a number of pre-installed applications.

Eeebuntu 3.0 release 
The 3.0 release of Eeebuntu was based on Ubuntu 9.04. It addresses a number of issues with the integrated Intel graphics cards and provides Eee PC specific optimization.

Major changes to the approach of Eeebuntu's release saw rapid adoption with over 800,000 downloads and resulted in this version being awarded the Sourceforge Community Choice award for best new project in 2009.

See also 
 List of Ubuntu-based distributions
 EasyPeasy
 Ubuntu Netbook Edition

References

External links 
 Aurora OS
 Aurora OS on distrowatch.com

Ubuntu derivatives
Linux distributions